Unica is a studio album by Italian singer Ornella Vanoni, released on 29 January 2021 by BMG.

Overview
In 2013, Vanoni released the album Meticci, which was supposed to be her last studio album. However, in 2018, the singer signed a contract with BMG Rights Management to release one album. During the creation of Unica, the singer collaborated with Mauro Pagani for production and Fabio and Lac for arrangements and much of the songwriting.

Unica consists of eleven songs, one of which is instrumental and serves as an introduction. The album features several collaborations, including artists such as Francesco Gabbani, Carmen Consoli, Virginia Raffaele, Giuliano Sangiorgi, Renato Zero e Pacifico. From a musical point of view, the album is characterized by a strong presence of strings and wind instruments, as well as a variety of genres, ranging from Brazilian sound to author's music and jazz.

The release of the album was timed to coincide with the sixtieth anniversary of Vanoni's career.

Track listing

Personnel
 Ornella Vanoni – vocals (all tracks)
 Mauro Pagani – piano, arrangement (1), chromatic harmonica (5)
 Quartetto Edo Dea Ensemble – bowed string instruments (1, 3, 6)
 Elio Rivagli – drums (2-4, 7–11)
 Massimiliano Gelsi – bass (2-4, 6–11)
 Luca Colombo – guitar (2-4, 6, 8–11), ukulele (3)
 Fabio Gianni – piano (2, 7), electric piano (7), organ (9)
 Fabio Ilacqua – arrangement (1), tastiera (2, 4–6, 8 e 10), electric piano (2-4, 11), background vocals (2-4, 6–10), programming (2-4, 6–9), percussion (2, 3, 5–7, 9, 10), piano (3-8, 10), synthesizer (3, 9), organ (4, 6, 8, 9), glockenspiel (5), melodica (6)
 Daniele Moretto – trumpet (2, 4, 6–9), flugelhorn (11)
 Gabriele Comeglio – alto saxophone (2, 4–9, 11), flute (2, 5–8, 11), clarinet (5), bass clarinet (11)
 Giulio Visibelli – tenor saxophone (2, 4–9, 11), flute (2, 5–8, 11)
 Andrea Andreoli – trombone (2, 4, 7–9, 11)
 Alex Battini de Barreiro – percussion (4, 7 e 8)
 Carmen Consoli – vocals, acoustic guitar (5)
 Giuseppe Salvadori – percussion (6)
 Virginia Raffaele – vocals (7)
 Walter Porro – accordion (8)

Charts

References

External links
 

2021 albums
Ornella Vanoni albums
BMG Rights Management albums